Henry Adam Bruce (16 May 1884 –  11 October 1958), known as Harry Bruce, was an Australian politician and former union organiser. First entering state politics in Queensland before later entering Parliament of the Commonwealth.

Biography
Born in Wandiligong, Victoria, he was educated at Haileybury College in Melbourne before moving to Queensland to become a bushworker in 1902. Later, he was a sugar grower and an organiser of the Australian Workers' Union (AWU).

In 1923 Bruce was elected to the Legislative Assembly of Queensland as the Labor member for the district of Kennedy. In 1932, he was elected as member for The Tableland. In that year he was appointed Secretary of Public Works; in 1938 he was also made Secretary of Public Instruction, a position he held until 1941. In 1947 he was transferred from Public Works to Public Instruction. During this time, the Bruce Highway was named in his honour.

Bruce left the Queensland Legislative Assembly in 1950, and the following year was elected to the Australian House of Representatives as the Labor member for Leichhardt. Bruce died in 1958 and was buried in Balmoral Cemetery. As the federal election of that year was drawing close, no by-election was held to replace him.

References

External links

1868 births
1958 deaths
Australian Labor Party members of the Parliament of Australia
Members of the Australian House of Representatives for Leichhardt
Members of the Australian House of Representatives
Members of the Queensland Legislative Assembly
Burials in Balmoral Cemetery, Brisbane
20th-century Australian politicians